Portugal competes at the 2018 Mediterranean Games in Taragona, Spain from 22 June to 1 July 2018.

Medal summary

Medal table 

|  style="text-align:left; width:78%; vertical-align:top;"|

|  style="text-align:left; width:22%; vertical-align:top;"|

References 

 

Nations at the 2018 Mediterranean Games
Mediterranean Games
2018